Defending champion Andre Agassi defeated Michael Chang in a rematch of the previous year's final, 7–6(7–4), 6–4 to win the singles tennis title at the 1996 Cincinnati Masters.

Seeds
The top eight seeds received a bye to the second round.

  Pete Sampras (quarterfinals)
  Thomas Muster (semifinals)
  Michael Chang (final)
  Yevgeny Kafelnikov (quarterfinals)
  Goran Ivanišević (quarterfinals)
  Andre Agassi (champion)
  Richard Krajicek (third round)
  Jim Courier (third round)
  Wayne Ferreira (quarterfinals)
  Thomas Enqvist (semifinals)
  MaliVai Washington (second round)
  Todd Martin (second round)
  Marc Rosset (first round)
  Cédric Pioline (second round)
  Richey Reneberg (first round)
  Jason Stoltenberg (third round)

Draw

Finals

Top half

Section 1

Section 2

Bottom half

Section 3

Section 4

External links
 Main draw

Singles
1996 Great American Insurance ATP Championships